Antti Juhani Ahokas (born 24 January 1985) is a Finnish professional golfer.

Ahokas was born in Lappeenranta. After winning the Finnish Amateur Stroke Play Championship in 2005, he moved to the United States to attend the University of Minnesota, but left after just 3 months to return to Europe and further his ambitions as a professional.

In 2006, Ahokas won the Irish Amateur Open Stroke Play Championship beating future world number 1 and major winner Rory McIlroy in a playoff.

Having turned professional in 2006, Ahokas just failed to come through the European Tour final qualifying school and joined the second tier Challenge Tour for the 2007 season. In 2008, he won for the first time at the Abierto VISA de la Republica, becoming the first left-hander to take that title. Later in the season, he won again at the ECCO Tour Championship, and gained promotion the elite European Tour by ending the season ranked 19th on the money list.

Amateur wins
2004 Finnish Amateur Match Play Championship, Finnish Amateur International Open Championship
2005 Finnish Amateur Stroke Play Championship
2006 Irish Amateur Open Championship

Professional wins (7)

Challenge Tour wins (2)

1Co-sanctioned by the Tour de las Américas and the TPG Tour
2Co-sanctioned by the Nordic Golf League

Nordic Golf League wins (4)

1Co-sanctioned by the Challenge Tour

Finnish Tour wins (2)

Team appearances
Amateur
European Boys' Team Championship (representing Finland): 2002, 2003
Jacques Léglise Trophy (representing the Continent of Europe): 2002
European Youths' Team Championship  (representing Finland): 2004, 2006
Eisenhower Trophy (representing Finland): 2004, 2006
European Amateur Team Championship (representing Finland): 2005
European Youths' Team Championship  (representing Finland): 2004, 2006
Bonallack Trophy (representing Europe): 2006 (winners)
St Andrews Trophy (representing the Continent of Europe): 2006

See also
2008 Challenge Tour graduates

References

External links
 

Finnish male golfers
Minnesota Golden Gophers men's golfers
European Tour golfers
Left-handed golfers
Sportspeople from South Karelia
People from Lappeenranta
1985 births
Living people
21st-century Finnish people